The 2005 Calgary Stampeders season was the 48th season for the team in the Canadian Football League and their 67th overall. The Stampeders finished 2nd place in the West division with an 11–7 record. They appeared in the West Semi-Final where they lost to the Edmonton Eskimos.

Offseason

CFL Draft

Preseason

Regular season

Season standings

Season schedule

Playoffs

Schedule

West Semi-Final

Awards and records

2005 CFL All-Stars
RB – Joffrey Reynolds
LB – John Grace
K – Sandro DeAngelis

References

Calgary Stampeders seasons
Calgary Stampeders Season, 2005
2005 in Alberta